Alaska Historical Society is a 501(c)(3) non-profit state historical society in Anchorage, Alaska. The Alaska Historical Society advocates for educational projects regarding Alaska's history. The Society holds an annual conference with a silent auction fundraiser and publishes a semi-annual historical journal, Alaska History and a quarterly newsletter Alaska History News. The Historical Society also preserves important pieces of Alaska history and records through its archives.

References

External links
Official State Historical Society

State historical societies of the United States
Historic preservation organizations in the United States
Libraries in Alaska
History of Alaska